Lyrasis is a non-profit member organization serving and supporting libraries, archives, museums, and cultural heritage organizations around the world. Lyrasis is based in the United States. It was created in April 2009 from the merger of SOLINET and PALINET, two US-based library networks.  NELINET, the New England library network, also merged into Lyrasis in late 2009. In January 2011, the Bibliographical Center for Research phased out operations and joined Lyrasis.

Overview 

Lyrasis is a 501(c)(3) nonprofit membership organization whose mission is "to support enduring access to the world’s shared academic, scientific and cultural heritage through leadership in open technologies, content services,... and collaboration with archives, libraries, museums and knowledge communities worldwide." Organizational goals include: the development and selection of new technology solutions; fostering community-wide projects that help deliver better outcomes and services; content creation, acquisition and management; support for new content models and strategies; and large-scale knowledge management programs. 

Lyrasis has more than 1,000 members in 28 countries. Lyrasis is staffed by more than 50 individuals and the company has three main areas of focus: community supported/open source software; technology hosting services; content creation and acquisition. Lyrasis also offers consulting services. Members of Lyrasis include academic, public, special, school, and state libraries, as well as archives and museums. 

Kate Nevins was the Executive Director of Lyrasis from 2009 until her retirement in 2015. Robert Miller assumed the role of Chief Executive Officer in June 2015. 

In January 2019 Lyrasis and DuraSpace announced their intention to merge. This is the second time the two organizations have planned a merger.

Services 
Community Supported Open Source Software – Lyrasis is the structural and fiscal organizational home to two open source software solutions that have a combined membership of over 350 institutions. This unique model allows for community-driven governance and contribution to work inside the boundaries and security of a professionally managed host organization.

Technology Hosting Services – Lyrasis oversees the hosting and migration services for over 100 institutions from community software platforms. In addition, the software engineers and program managers from Lyrasis contribute code, training and documentation to the community.

Content Creation and Acquisition – Lyrasis is responsible for the negotiation of contracts with over 80 publishers, vendors, and partnering organizations. 

Consulting and Training – Lyrasis has workers who assist members in digitization, preservation, digital preservation, disaster preparedness and strategic planning.

Fiscal Services – Lyrasis assists institutions manage their annual budgets by allowing them to deposit funds for future use, protecting it from unanticipated budget adjustments.

Leader’s Circle, Leaders Forum and Catalyst Fund – More than 200 Lyrasis members are actively involved in these programs so far, engaging in early innovation exploration, cross-institution collaboration and initial vetting of ideas, services and programs. Our members work together on new ideas and trends throughout the year in informal forums. Catalyst Fund ideas submitted by members are then selected by vote of the Leaders Circle to be funded. During the annual Member Summit, Catalyst Fund recipients report on progress and members work together to consider future directions for funded projects, including expansion and potential grant or business planning.

Investments – Lyrasis works with members to submit and receive grants from foundations such as The Andrew W. Mellon Foundation, The Bill & Melinda Gates Foundation, The John S. and James L. Knight Foundation, and The Alfred P. Sloan Foundation to support ideas and programs on behalf of its members and other libraries, archives and museums who need access to these innovative programs. Furthermore, Lyrasis has reinvested proceeds from its traditional investments into potential ideas, program and solutions to benefit its membership.

Research and an Inclusive Approach to Open Access  - In  2020,  Lyrasis  Research  conducted  a  member  survey  of  predominantly  U.S. higher education libraries to understand the spectrum of attitudes and actions related to Open Access. The results indicated that  the  U.S.  approach  to  OA  is  decentralised,  lacking  the  focused  trends  that  are  apparent  in  other  areas  of  the  world. Only a quarter of institutions are paying for OA on behalf of 60% of students, demonstrating a major imbalance in support of OA programs. In 2021  43%  of  all  U.S.  higher  education  institutions  at  the  doc-toral  level  are  participating  in  OA  programs  through  Lyrasis.

Open source 
Since 2013 Lyrasis has supported a number of open source software efforts. Lyrasis serves as the organizational home for a number of open source communities including ArchivesSpace, CollectionSpace, Fedora, ORCiD, and Vivo. Additionally, Lyrasis provides hosting services, technical and user support, and code contributions for ArchivesSpace, CollectionSpace, DSpaceDirect, DuraCloud, Islandora and the Palace Project.

References 

Library consortia in the United States
OCLC
Organizations based in Atlanta